The 2013 Ontario Mine Rescue Provincial Competition was held June 5–7 at the South Windsor Recreation Complex, in Windsor, Ontario.

List of competing teams

Kirkland Lake District

Kirkland Lake Gold - Macassa Mine

Onaping District
Glencore - Xstrata Nickel

Red Lake District
Goldcorp - Musselwhite Mine

Southern District

Canadian Gypsum Company - Hagarsville Mine

Sudbury District

Vale - West Mines

Timmins District
Glencore Xstrata Copper - Kidd Operations

Thunder Bay Algoma District
Wesdome - Eagle River Mine

List of competing technicians

Awards

References

Mining in Ontario
2013 in Ontario
Mining rescues